The Amerigo Vespucci is a tall ship of the Italian Navy (Marina Militare) named after the explorer Amerigo Vespucci. Its home port is La Spezia, Italy, and it is in use as a school ship.

History
In 1925, the Regia Marina ordered two school ships to a design by General Lieutenant Francesco Rotundi of the Italian Navy Engineering Corps, inspired by the style of large late 18th century 74-cannon ships of the line (like the Neapolitan ship Monarca). The first, the Cristoforo Colombo, was put into service in 1928 and was used by the Italian Navy until 1943. After World War II, this ship was handed over to the USSR as part of the war reparations and was shortly afterwards decommissioned.

The second ship was the Amerigo Vespucci, built in 1930 at the (formerly Royal) Naval Shipyard of Castellammare di Stabia (Naples).  She was launched on February 22, 1931, and put into service in July of that year.

Under auxiliary diesel-electric propulsion the Amerigo Vespucci can reach  and has a range of 5450 nm at 6.5 knots.

The three steel masts are 50, 54 and 43 metres high, and carry sails totaling . The Amerigo Vespucci has 26 sails – square sails, staysails, and jibs: all are traditional canvas sails. When under sail in severe sea and wind conditions she can reach . The rig, some 30 km of ropes, uses only traditional hemp ropes; only the mooring lines are synthetic, to comply with port regulations.

The hull is painted black with two white stripes, harking back to the two gun decks of the ships her design is based on, but she carries only two 6pdr saluting guns in pivot mountings on the deck, forward of the mainmast. The deck planks are of teak wood and must be replaced every three years. Bow and stern are decorated with intricate ornaments; she has a life-size figurehead of Amerigo Vespucci. The stern gallery is accessible only through the Captain's saloon.

The standard crew of the Amerigo Vespucci is 16 officers, 70 non-commissioned officers and 190 sailors. In summer, when she embarks the midshipmen of the Naval Academy (Accademia Navale), the crew totals some 450.

In 1964, the ship was fitted with two 4-stroke, 8-cylinder FIAT B 308 ESS diesel engines, which replaced the original 2-stroke 6-cylinder FIAT Q 426 engines.

After update works, between 2013 and 2016, the ship has been fitted with two 4-stroke, 12-cylinder MTU, 1,32 MW each diesel engine generators and two 4-stroke, 8-cylinder MTU, 760 kW each diesel engine generators, and one NIDEC (Ansaldo Sistemi Industriali) electric engine. During the same work, the ship has been fitted with new radar GEM Elettronica AN/SPS-753(V)5, new satellite antenna ORBIT AL-7103.

When carrying cadets, the ship is usually steered from the manual stern rudder station, which is operated by four steering wheels with two men each. At other times, the hydraulically assisted steering on the bridge is used. Except for the anchor winch, the winches aboard are not power operated. The bridge is equipped with sophisticated modern electronic navigation instruments.

Other than during World War II, the Amerigo Vespucci has been continually active. Most of her training cruises are in European waters, but she has also sailed to North and South America, and navigated the Pacific. In 2002, she undertook a voyage around the world.

In 1960, Vespucci carried the Olympic torch from Piraeus to Syracuse for the Summer Olympics in Rome.

While sailing the Mediterranean Sea in 1962, the American aircraft carrier USS Independence flashed the Amerigo Vespucci with the light signal asking: "Who are you?" The full-rigged ship answered: "Training ship Amerigo Vespucci, Italian Navy." The Independence replied: "You are the most beautiful ship in the world." In 2022 the Amerigo Vespucci sailed by the American aircraft carrier USS George H.W. Bush, which saluted the ship and commented: "You are still, after 60 years, the most beautiful ship in the world."

The Amerigo Vespucci often takes part in sailing parades and Tall Ships' Races, where she is in amicable rivalry with the Gorch Fock. When she is berthed in port, public tours of the vessel are usually offered. The ship circumnavigated the globe in 2003. The "Vespucci" from 2013 depends directly on the Commander in Chief Naval Fleet.

The ship received major modernization works, from 2013 to 2016.
On 7 July 2018, Amerigo Vespucci arrived to the port of Almeria. It is the third time it visited Almería: the first time was in 1932, and the second was in 1989. It left the city on 10 July. Then it traveled to Ponta Delgada, in the Azores Islands, and it crossed the Atlantic Ocean to Northern Europe.

Tender
In April 2015 tender NC90 was replaced by the following:
 Shipyard: Cantiere Nautico Tagliapietra,  Venice
 displacement: 
 length: 
 beam: 
 propulsion: 2 x FPT S30  each
 speed: 
 range:

See also 
 List of large sailing vessels
 Tall Ships' Races

References

External links

Congedati Vespucci Amerigo Vespucci's crew web site
Italian web site about the Amerigo Vespucci, with images of the interior. (In Italian.)

Individual sailing vessels
Training ships of the Italian Navy
Tall ships of Italy
Training ships of the Regia Marina
Full-rigged ships
Ships built in Castellammare di Stabia
Articles containing video clips
1931 ships